The German torpedo boat T5 was one of a dozen Type 35 torpedo boats built for the Kriegsmarine (German Navy) during the late 1930s. Completed in 1940, she was assigned escort duties in June–July before she was tasked to escort minelayers as they laid their minefields in the North Sea and English Channel in August and September. T5 was transferred to Norway by November and escorted minelaying missions and supported operations in the Baltic Sea after the start of Operation Barbarossa in June 1941. T5 returned to France at the end of the year and then escorted a pair of battleships and a heavy cruiser through the Channel back to Germany in early 1942 in the Channel Dash.

The boat was transferred back to Norway upon her return and resumed her escort duties there before beginning a refit. Upon its completion T5 was assigned to escort convoys in the Baltic Sea until she was transferred back to France in early 1943 where she helped to escort blockade runners and U-boats through the Bay of Biscay and lay minefields. The boat returned to Germany and was assigned to the Torpedo School in mid-1943. She returned to active duty in late 1944 and escorted German ships as they bombarded Soviet positions. T5 struck a mine in March 1945 and sank with few casualties.

Design and description
The Type 35 was an unsuccessful attempt by the Kriegsmarine to design a fast, ocean-going torpedo boat that did not exceed the  displacement limit of the London Naval Treaty for ships that counted against the national tonnage limit. Their crew numbered 119 officers and sailors.

As built, the Type 35 class mounted a single  SK C/32 gun on the stern. Anti-aircraft defense was provided by a single  SK C/30 anti-aircraft gun superfiring over the 10.5 cm gun and a pair of  C/30 guns on the bridge wings. They carried six above-water  torpedo tubes in two triple mounts and could also carry 30 mines (or 60 if the weather was good). Many boats exchanged the 3.7 cm gun for another 2 cm gun, depth charges and minesweeping paravanes before completion. Late-war additions were limited to the installation of radar, radar detectors and additional AA guns, usually at the expense of the aft torpedo tube mount.

Construction and career
T5 was ordered on 15 January 1936 from DeSchiMAG, laid down at their Bremen shipyard on 30 December 1936 as yard number 934, launched on 22 November 1937 and commissioned on 23 January 1940. The boat was working up until June when she was transferred to the Skaggerak for convoy escort duties. From 25–28 July, T5 was one of the escorts for the badly damaged battleship  from Trondheim, Norway to Kiel, Germany. The flotilla escorted a minelaying mission in the English Channel on 5–6 September and then laid minefields itself on 8–9 and 15–16 September in the Straits of Dover. T5 began a refit in March in Bremen that lasted until September.

T2, T5, T7, T8 and T11 were among the escorts for the Baltic Fleet, a temporary formation built around the battleship , as it sortied into the Sea of Åland on 23–29 September to forestall any attempt by the Soviet Red Banner Baltic Fleet to breakout from the Gulf of Finland. Dagö was captured on 12–13 October after T5 is part of a decoy force used to distract the defenders. She went to France in January 1942 and rejoined the 2nd Torpedo Boat Flotilla. After arriving in Germany, T5 and T12 were transferred to Norway for escort duties. On 6 March they briefly screened Tirpitz as she searched for the Russia-bound Convoy PQ 12. T5 and T7 escorted the heavy cruiser  and the replenishment oiler Dithmarschen from Trondheim to Narvik on 9–10 May. T5 was refitted in East Prussia from August to November and then remained in the Baltic Sea on escort duties until March 1943.

She was transferred to France the following month. On 5–8 May, the 2nd Torpedo Boat Flotilla with T2, T5 and the torpedo boats  and T22 laid three minefields in the Channel. The following month the ships returned to the Bay of Biscay to help escort U-boats through the Bay. T5, T2 and T18 arrived back in Germany on 1 July and T5 began an engine overhaul at Wesermünde. She was transferred to the Torpedo School as a training ship in October and then began a lengthy refit from March to August 1944. Rejoining the 2nd Flotilla, now consisting of T5, T9, T12, T13 and T16, the flotilla screened Admiral Scheer as she shelled Soviet positions during the evacuation of Sworbe, on the island of Ösel, on the night of 23/24 November.

Notes

References

External links
Type 35 on German Navy.de

Type 35 torpedo boats
1937 ships